Lasioderma haemorrhoidale is a species of beetle in the family Ptinidae.

A small beetle unintentionally introduced from the Mediterranean region, it feeds on Malta starthistle seed heads, but has had little effect in controlling the plant.

References

Further reading

 
 
 
 
 

Ptinidae
Beetles described in 1807